

See also 
 Lists of fossiliferous stratigraphic units in Europe

References 
 

 Latvia
Geology of Latvia
Fossiliferous stratigraphic units
Fossiliferous stratigraphic units